The 2023 Individual Speedway World Championship Grand Prix Qualification or GP Challenge was a series of motorcycle speedway meetings used to determine the three riders that qualified for the 2023 Speedway Grand Prix. The series consisted of four qualifying rounds at Abensberg, Debrecen, Žarnovica and Nagyhalász and the Grand Prix Challenge at Glasgow.  Preliminary national qualification events included the 2021 American Final, the Polish Golden Helmet and the DMU qualifier.

The three riders that qualified for the 2023 series were Kim Nilsson, Jack Holder and Max Fricke. Dan Bewley finished second in the Grand Prix Challenge, but he already qualified due to making the top six in the 2022 Speedway Grand Prix series.

In the final Anders Thomsen broke his leg in heat 14 but would later be selected as a permanent rider for the 2023 Speedway Grand Prix.

Qualifying rounds

Final 
{| width=100%
|width=50% valign=top|

Grand Prix Challenge 
20 August 2022
 Glasgow

 Chris Holder and Michael Jepsen Jensen replaced the injured Martin Vaculík and Kai Huckenbeck.

 Max Fricke qualified in fourth as Dan Bewley finished in the top six in the 2022 Speedway Grand Prix series.

See also 
 2022 Speedway Grand Prix

References 

Speedway Grand Prix Qualification
Speedway Grand Prix Qualifications
Qualification